USA European Connection was a disco group created by producer Boris Midney and featuring vocals by Leza Holmes, Renne Johnson, and Sharon Williams. In 1978 USA European Connection hit #1 on the Hot Dance Music/Club Play chart with the Come into My Heart album. 

Midney who was among the principal architects of the Eurodisco sound and one of the first to exploit the full potential of 48-track recording, his trademark blend of strings, horn and percussion created a deep, lush sound. Born in Russia, Midney is a classically trained composer who started out writing film scores; turning to disco, however, he worked under a variety of names including Caress, Beautiful Bend, the USA/European Connection, Masquerade, Double Discovery, Companion and Festival, producing a large body of work from his New York City studio ERAS recording.

See also
List of number-one dance hits (United States)
List of artists who reached number one on the US Dance chart

References

American disco groups
American disco girl groups
American dance music groups